XP-PEN (stylised as XPPen) is a graphics tablet development and distribution company, originally established in Japan in 2005 by Taiwanese manufacturer P-Active and now headquartered in Shenzhen, China with a research and development office in California, United States. In  2019, XP-PEN became a holding subsidiary of Hanvon Ugee Group, a graphics tablet manufacturer who, like XP-PEN, also is headquartered in Shenzhen, China and specializes in the development of graphics tablets, pen display monitors, light pads, stylus pens and digital graphical products. 

In July 2017 they took part in Los Angeles' 25th Anime Expo, and in October later that year they also exhibited in Stan Lee Comic Con during the Halloween weekend and in December were invited to DreamWorks campus in Glendale California.

As of 2022, it is the second largest pen tablet market in Japan after Wacom, with a market share of 5.2%.

Product lines 

Artist series display

Drivers 
XP-Pen supplies drivers for Windows 7, 8, and 10; OS X 10.8 and above; and CentOS, Linux Mint, and Ubuntu. Most of XP-Pen's products have a driver for Windows and Mac, with specific drivers provided for the supported Linux distributions (see the table below).

References

Pointing devices
Electronics companies of China
Electronics companies of Japan